The ZB-53 was a Czechoslovak machine gun. A versatile weapon, it was used both as a squad support weapon, as a mounted machine gun for tanks and other armoured vehicles, and on fixed positions inside Czechoslovak border fortifications. Adopted before the World War II by the armies of Czechoslovakia (as TK vz. 37) and Romania, it was also license-built in the United Kingdom as the Besa machine gun. Following the German invasion of Czechoslovakia, large quantities of the weapon were captured by the Wehrmacht and used during the war under the designation of MG 37(t).

History 
The ZB-53 was designed as a private venture by Václav Holek and Miroslav Rolčík of the Zbrojovka Brno works as a replacement for the Schwarzlose machine gun of World War I origin. Czechoslovakia purchased 500 for testing giving them the designation Vz.35 ("1935 Model"). Based on these tests some improvements were requested and the improved ZB-53 was adopted by the Czechoslovak Army with the designation TK vz. 37 ("Heavy Machine Gun Mark 1937"). It was introduced as the standard machine gun of Czechoslovak LT-35 and LT-38 tanks. Czechoslovakia exported the gun to Romania, Yugoslavia (1,000 pcs in March-April 1940), Argentina, Afghanistan, Iran and China (large numbers were used during the Second Sino-Japanese War), while UK bought a licence and started to produce its own version, known as the Besa machine gun (over 60,000 pieces made). During the German occupation of the factory, large numbers were produced for the Waffen-SS until 1942.

Czechoslovak Zbrojovka Brno and then Zbrojovka Vsetín produced the gun in large quantities until the 1950s.

The weapon was a gas-operated, belt-fed, air-cooled machine gun that served both the infantry support and vehicle weapons roles. The machine gun was delivered in three variants: infantry machine gun (on heavy tripod), heavy bunker machine gun (with heavier barrel, marked "O") and for armoured vehicles (marked "ÚV"). It was designed to withstand five minutes of constant fire, after which time the barrel had to be changed due to wear. Although modern, the weapon was prone to jamming due to a complicated rate of fire selection mechanism.

Users 

: Used by Mukti Bahini forces during the Bangladesh Liberation War
: At least 20 were sold to Biafra in 1967.

 

 
 

 used by PLAN
 : Installed as coaxial machine gun on 38/39M light tanks(Praga LTP) in Peruvian service
 : Used by the defunct Panama Defense Forces, notably mounted on Jeeps.
: Besa machine gun

: 5,500 purchased by mid-1943

See also
Weapons of Czechoslovakia interwar period
Besa machine gun
ZB vz. 26

Notes

References

External links

Modern Firearms

Machine guns of Czechoslovakia
World War II infantry weapons of Germany
World War II infantry weapons of China
World War II machine guns
Medium machine guns
7.92×57mm Mauser machine guns
Military equipment introduced in the 1930s